Tedenby is a Swedish surname. Notable people with the surname include:

Lage Tedenby (born 1937), Swedish long-distance runner
Mattias Tedenby (born 1990), Swedish ice hockey player

Swedish-language surnames